Neil Leyton is a Portuguese-Canadian singer and guitarist born in Lisbon. He has lived and played music in Toronto, London, and Stockholm.

He was a founding member and songwriter in Canadian art-glam indie project The Conscience Pilate from 1995 to 1998, beginning a solo career in 1999. He is also the founder of the Fading Ways record label, one of the first to use Creative Commons licenses. Leyton was a vocal proponent of the Creative Commons giving several seminars and speaking at conferences about its possible uses in the music industry, including Music Tank (London) and Popkomm (Berlin).

He has also played guitar for other musical projects live and in the studio, most notably British glam rockers Dogs D'Amour, Canadian rockers Crash Kelly (fellow Canadian musician Sean Kelly's band) and Canadian power pop outfit Galore. He participated in a side-project with Ky Anto, titled Pretty Volume, and recorded an EP with fellow Canadian guitarist Rich Jones and The Wildhearts' frontman Ginger in the UK. The Hellacopters's Nicke Andersson and Backyard Babies's guitarist Dregen were guests on Leyton's The Betrayal of the Self album, released in 2006 via Feedback Boogie and Fading Ways Records.

In December 2008 he released an exclusive fans-only new album, Metacognitive Apperceptions. Leyton has also produced several independent recording sessions for artists such as Mark Fernyhough and Maria Pettersson.

In 2009 he participated in a new side project with The Hellacopters' Nicke Andersson, called The Point, releasing a 7" vinyl single. He also co-wrote and sang on Andersson's debut solo album Imperial State Electric, on the track "Deja Vu", released in 2010.

At the end of 2010 he released the Elite Nylon album. In early 2011, AWAL released the compilation Out of Synch, featuring mostly acoustic material from Leyton's back-catalogue as well as some unreleased tracks.

In 2016, Portugal's Polk Salad Records re-issued Leyton's The Betrayal of the Self album via the Spanish Distributor Altafonte. Leyton also announced a new upcoming album from his new, Portugal-based project Lusitanian Ghosts, whose first single was titled "Blossom", recorded in the city of Setubal.

Discography

EPs:

 My New Soul (Fading Ways/RCD 2001)
 Beat (Fading Ways 2004)
 Dead Fashion Brigade (Fading Ways 2005)

Albums:

 Down Secret Avenue with the Last Lovers (Fading Ways 1999)
 From the brighter side of her Midnight Sun (Fading Ways 2002/ChangesOne 2003)
 The Betrayal of the Self (Fading Ways / Feedback Boogie 2006)
 A Reckoning (Fading Ways (UK, Canada, Finland) / Finetunes (Germany) / Kunaki (USA) 2007)
 Metacognitive Apperceptions (Fading Ways / Kunaki 2008)
 Elite Nylon (Fading Ways Music Store / Finetunes 2010)
 Out of Synch (Fabulous Generation / AWAL 2011)

With Galore:
 Parader (Riptide/EMI Music Canada 2003)

With The Conscience Pilate:
 Living in a movie scene (Fading Ways 1996)
 Sunday Refugees (Guru Records 1998)

With Pretty Volume:
 Pretty Volume (Fading Ways / Finetunes / Kunaki 2008)

With The Point:
 Give it a try 7" (Fading Ways Finland 2010)

With Lusitanian Ghosts:
 "Blossom" (Single, Lusitanian / Altafonte 2014)

References

Leyton on Creative Commons: *
Music Tank: *

External links
Official Website
Fading Ways Music Canada label site
MySpace Page
Leyton conference on Creative Commons, Helsinki, Finland
Neil Leyton on LastFM
Leyton on Amie Street
Soulshine magazine Interview
Leyton on Jamendo
Noise Finland Betrayal of the Self album review
Digital Copyright.ca on Fading Ways and Creative Commons
Neil Leyton at Internet Archive
Leyton on Five Miles High UK

Living people
Canadian rock guitarists
Canadian male guitarists
Canadian rock singers
Canadian male singers
Year of birth missing (living people)